The Catamount Library Network (CLN) is a consortium of public libraries in the U.S. State of Vermont.  It provides a unified library catalog using the open source, Koha integrated library system.

Organization 
The Catamount Library Network is incorporated as a 501(c)(3) organization, governed by a 5-member board, chosen by a council composed of one representative from each member library, and officers (president, vice president, secretary, and treasurer), chosen by the board.  The council also sets the CLN's annual budget and membership fees, and approves any bylaw changes.

In addition, two groups have been established with representatives from each library, to address, respectively, cataloging and circulation & loans issues arising within the CLN.

History and current status 
The development and planning of The Catamount Library Network (CLN) began in 2010 with an initial 5 member libraries, with seed money, initial consultation, and support provided by the Vermont Department of Libraries.  The Department of Libraries withdrew most of its assistance over several months in 2015.

The primary motivation for forming the organization was cost savings from switching from proprietary to open source software, and by having one shared system (as opposed to each library maintaining, and paying for, its own separate system).  Additionally, a unified catalog allows easier resource sharing between libraries.

Initially, the CLN planned to use the Evergreen Integrated Library System, but later selected Koha as its ILS.

The first 5 libraries switched to the new system in the spring and summer of 2013.  An additional 12 libraries have since joined the organization, 9 of which, have added their holdings to the unified catalog.  3 other libraries are currently in various stages of preparation.

One library, Lawrence Memorial Library in Bristol, VT initially joined, but left before being added to the consortium's catalog.  It has since joined VOKAL instead. As a result of concern over unrecovered transition costs from Lawrence Memorial leaving CLN, the board voted on September 22, 2014, to require new members to pay a non-refundable deposit of $350(US).

The CLN continues to seek additional members.

Database hosting 

The Catamount Library Network's common Koha database and software are hosted by ByWater Solutions.

VOKAL (The Vermont Organization of Koha Automated Libraries) 
There is currently one other unified public library catalog in Vermont—VOKAL (The Vermont Organization of Koha Automated Libraries), established by the Green Mountain Library Consortium, and (like CLN), hosted by ByWater Solutions.

CLN Member libraries (current and former)

References

External links 
 Catamount Library Network
 Vermont Department of Libraries

Public libraries in Vermont
2010 establishments in Vermont
Organizations established in 2010
Library consortia in Vermont